

See also 
List of the largest cannon by caliber

Coastal